The 2008–09 Liga Gimel season saw 83 clubs competing in 6 regional divisions for promotion to Liga Bet. This was the last season that Liga Gimel was the sixth tier in the Israeli football league system, a position it held since 1998–99.

At the end of the season, due to the league system restructuring, two clubs from each division were promoted to Liga Bet.

Upper Galilee Division

Hapoel Jatt Yanuh HaGlilit, Hapoel Hatzor and Maccabi Kafr Yasif all registered to play in the division, but withdrew before playing a single match.

Jezreel Division

Hapoel Muawiya registered to play in the division, but withdrew before playing a single match.

Samaria Division

Sharon Division

Tel Aviv Division

Central Division

Promotion play-offs
As F.C. Kiryat Gat, Hapoel Rahat and Bnei Yichalel Rehovot finished level on points, the three clubs played a promotion play-offs to determine the league winner and the promoting clubs to Liga Bet.

References
Liga Gimel Upper Galilee The Israel Football Association 
Liga Gimel Jezreel The Israel Football Association 
Liga Gimel Samaria The Israel Football Association 
Liga Gimel Sharon The Israel Football Association 
Liga Gimel Tel Aviv The Israel Football Association 
Liga Gimel Central The Israel Football Association 

6
Liga Gimel seasons